The 1901 Drake Bulldogs football team was an American football team that represented Drake University during the 1901 college football season. In its second season under head coach Charles Best, the team compiled a 4–4 record and outscored opponents by a total of 113 to 34.

Schedule

References

Drake
Drake Bulldogs football seasons
Drake Bulldogs football